Kentucky Route 182 (KY 182) is a  state highway in Carter County, Kentucky, that runs from Kentucky Route 986 in rural Carter County south of Grahn to an unknown point on McGlone Creek Road 0.678 miles (1.091 km) past Cedar Run Road in rural Carter County southwest of Carter via Grahn.

Route description
Route 182 begins in rural Carter County (near Grayson Lake State Park) at its junction with KY 986. It runs north to the community of Grahn before turning northwest and running until it reaches US 60 just east of Olive Hill. This section of KY 182 is 8.535 miles and is classified "Rural Secondary" by the Kentucky Department of Transportation.

Route 182 runs concurrent with US 60 for two miles in a north-northeasterly direction, interchanging with I-64 at mile marker 161. It then splits from US 60 and runs north past the entrance to Carter Caves State Resort Park, which is situated west of KY182 near the community of Wolf. It then proceeds northwest until Wesleyville, Kentucky, where it intersects with KY 2. This section of KY 182 is 7.333 miles and is classified "State Secondary" by KDOT. After a short concurrency with Route 2, Route 182 splits off to the northwest and continues until McGlone Creek Road, where state maintenance ends.

Major intersections

References

Further reading
 

0182
Transportation in Carter County, Kentucky